The 1948 Norwegian Football Cup was the 43rd season of the Norwegian annual knockout football tournament. The tournament was open for all members of NFF, except those from Northern Norway. The final was played at Marienlyst Stadion in Drammen on 16 October 1932, and was a replay of the 1935 final with five-time former winners Fredrikstad, and three-time former winners Sarpsborg. Unlike the 1935-final, the final was won Sarpsborg, with a 1-0 margin, which secured their fourth title. Skeid were the defending champions, but were eliminated by Kvik (Trondheim) in the fourth round.

The eight district champions in the 1947–48 League of Norway (Sparta, Mjøndalen, Viking, Freidig, Storm, Kapp, Brann and Kristiansund) got a walkover in the first round, and the four semi-finalists in the playoffs (Sparta, Mjøndalen, Viking and Freidig) got a walkover in the second round.

First round

|-
|colspan="3" style="background-color:#97DEFF"|Replay

|}

Second round

|-
|colspan="3" style="background-color:#97DEFF"|Replay

|}

Third round

|colspan="3" style="background-color:#97DEFF"|15 August 1948

|-
|colspan="3" style="background-color:#97DEFF"|Replay: 18 August 1948

|}

Fourth round

|colspan="3" style="background-color:#97DEFF"|29 August 1948

|-
|colspan="3" style="background-color:#97DEFF"|Replay: 5 September 1948

|}

Quarter-finals

|colspan="3" style="background-color:#97DEFF"|26 September 1948

|}

Semi-finals

|colspan="3" style="background-color:#97DEFF"|3 October 1948

|}

Final

See also
1947–48 League of Norway
1948 in Norwegian football

References

Norwegian Football Cup seasons
Norway
Cup